Berjaya is a former political party based in Sabah, Malaysia.

Berjaya may also refer to:

Berjaya Air, an airline based in Malaysia
Berjaya Group, a Malaysian-based company